Linsay Willier is a Canadian model, motivational speaker, and actress. She was the runner-up on Canada's Next Top Model, Cycle 3.

Early life 
Willier was born on July 16 in High Prairie, Alberta.  Linsay is a member of Sucker Creek First Nation and was raised on her reserve before moving to Edmonton, Alberta to pursue her education. Willier completed her bachelor's degree in Child and Youth Care at  Grant MacEwan University.  During her fourth year of school she was chosen as a finalist for Canada's Next Top Model. Not wanting to drop out of school, Linsay completed her final semester in two weeks. Linsay won the coveted first runner up prize on Canada's Next Top Model and made it home in time to attend her graduation.

Canada's Next Top Model 
Willier auditioned for the third cycle of Canada's Next Top Model, she was selected as one of 11 finalists from over 6,000 applicants. Willier came in second against Meaghan Waller.

Career

Linsay was discovered at West Edmonton Mall by a Western Canada Fashion Week Designer. Before Canada's Next Top Model, Willier had walked in Western Canada Fashion Week, modeled with Shemar Moore, and was regularly featured in the Edmonton Journal.

After Canada's Next Top Model, Linsay went on to have a successful modelling career which included walking in Toronto Fashion Week. She also appeared in several fashion campaigns such as Sho Sho Esquiro's 2012 Collection and Bethany Yellowtail "Millenia" Collective which was featured in Vogue Magazine. In 2009 she created her youth empowerment company Dreams in Motion which provided interactive self-esteem and confidence building workshops. Dreams in Motion was featured in New Tribe Magazine, Feb. 2010.

Linsay competed in Miss Universe Canada in 2011 where she won the People's Choice Award.

References

External links
Portfolio on Canada's Next Top Model Cycle 3

Canadian female models
Cree people
Top Model finalists
Living people
Canada's Next Top Model participants
People from Big Lakes County
Year of birth missing (living people)